, also known as  , is an uninhabited volcanic pillar located in the Ōsumi Islands and belonging to Kagoshima Prefecture, Japan.

Geography
Denshima is located roughly equidistant between Iōjima and Kuroshima. The island is an exposed and highly eroded portion of lava dome associated with the submarine Kikai Caldera, a stratovolcano rising from the ocean floor.

See also

 Desert island
 List of islands

Stacks of Japan
Ōsumi Islands
Islands of Kagoshima Prefecture
Uninhabited islands of Japan